Daisy Group Limited (formerly known as Freedom4 Group plc and Pipex Communications plc) is a British company that sells Internet and telecommunications services, including internet hosting, broadband Internet connections, and VOIP.

History
The company traces back to the October 2003 acquisition of Pipex by GX Networks, to create Pipex Communications plc. The following month Firstnet Services changed its name to PIPEX Communications Business Solutiod AIM Listed Host Europe plc in April 2004.

Pipex acquired the business communications provider Nildram in August 2004.

In 2005, the company purchased Donhost and freedom2surf. and was named the 'Fastest Growing Technology Business in the UK' in the 2005 Sunday Times Tech Track 

John Caudwell sold Caudwell Communications UK Limited which traded as Homecall in March 2006. Homecall then began trading as Pipex Homecall.

In 2006 Pipex bought Supanetwork for £2.1 million in cash. This was followed by Toucan and the customer base of Bulldog Broadband.

In March 2007 the company appointed UBS to consider its strategic options, in regards to a possible sale of the company. Tiscali UK announced in July that year that it would purchase the Pipex voice and broadband division for £210 million. The sale completed in September. The remaining assets not sold to Tiscali UK were put up for sale at the same time.

The remaining Pipex assets were renamed as Freedom4 Communications plc in March 2008. 
Freedom4 bought UK based WiFi roaming services provider BOZII and renamed the service FREEDOM4 WiFi. Freedom4 renamed itself Freedom4 Group in August 2008.

In July 2009, FREEDOM4 bought Daisy Communications (founded in 2001 in Nelson, Lancashire) in a reverse takeover. The two companies came together with Vialtus to become Daisy Group plc. In 2009 Daisy Group also floated on the London Stock Exchange's Alternative Investment Market. 

In February 2010, Daisy Group bought the entire issued share capital of Managed Communications, a provider of data networks, for a potential initial cash consideration of £6.3m.

In June 2010, Daisy Group sold its WiMax licensing business which was once part of its Freedom4 subsidiary to PCCW-owned UK Broadband. Daisy Group bought the entire issued share capital of murphx Innovative Solutions Limited, a wholesale connectivity and hosting carrier that was voted ISP of the Year in the Comms Business Awards 2009 for an initial cash consideration of £4.8m. The business became Daisy Wholesale.

In December 2010, Daisy Group bought controversial NHS GP phone system provider Network Europe Group (NEG) for £23.5m.

In 2011, Daisy Group acquired O-bit Telecom, which initially operated independently under the group, but subsequently became part of Daisy Wholesale.

In January 2015, with a market value of £500m and 1,500 employees, Daisy became a private company.

Daisy acquired Damovo UK and Phoenix IT Group.

In December 2016, Daisy Group made its 50th acquisition by purchasing Alternative Networks plc for £184m.

In 2018, Daisy Group acquired Voice Mobile and DV02. 

In 2019, Daisy Group separated into four independent businesses. These companies were rebranded and renamed as;  Daisy Communications, Daisy Corporate Services, Aurora and Digital Wholesale Solutions

References

External links
Official Daisy Comms website

Internet service providers of the United Kingdom
Companies based in Lancashire
Telecommunications companies established in 1991
1991 establishments in England